Kaye Stevens (born Catherine Louise Stephens, also sometimes spelled Kay Stevens, July 21, 1932 – December 28, 2011) was an American singer and actress. Her big break in show business came at the Riviera Hotel in Las Vegas, when the headliner for the night, Debbie Reynolds, became ill and Stevens filled in for the night. She then went on to do small shows in New York City at the Plaza Hotel's Persian Room and the Waldorf Astoria, and Caesars Palace on the Las Vegas Strip.

Early life
Born Catherine Louise Stephens in Pittsburgh, Pennsylvania on July 21, 1932, she was an only child. Her family eventually moved to Cleveland, where she got her start as a drummer and singer as a teenager.

Career

Acting
Stevens started out in film in The Interns (1962), where she played Didi Loomis, a nurse, and its 1964 sequel The New Interns. She also appeared in The Man From the Diners' Club (1963), which starred Danny Kaye. Stevens had a role in the television movie Let's Switch! (1975) and in 1983 appeared in the film Jaws 3-D. She was considered for the title role for the musical Funny Girl (Barbra Streisand) in the early 1960s.

In her role on Days of Our Lives, Stevens introduced a new song, "You Light Up My Life", to the television audience. It was a huge success, and soon after, Kaye decided that she had to write new songs and create an album: "I knew then that if I got the kind of response from one song, I had to do an album of inspirational, motivational, spiritual-pop music."

Stevens appeared on such television game shows as Match Game, Hollywood Squares, Celebrity Sweepstakes, The Price Is Right, Tattletales (Episode #2.28 on Oct. 21, 1974 appearing with then boyfriend Tom Lindstrom), and Password. She appeared as a guest star on many series, including CHiPs, Police Woman,  and B.L. Stryker. Since 1994, Stevens was a regular on Hour of Power.

Singing
After her big break at the Riviera Hotel in Las Vegas, she went from small audiences to sold-out audiences in New York City, Miami, and Los Angeles. From there, she went on tour with The Rat Pack, Johnny Carson, and Bob Hope.

Personal life and death
Stevens married bandleader and trumpet player Tommy Amato in 1955. The couple performed throughout the eastern United States. They divorced in 1961. Stevens then married realtor Gerald Armstrong in September 1964 in Honolulu, Hawaii, but they divorced after less than one year. Stevens's third marriage, to Miami attorney Woodrow Maxwell "Mac" Melvin, also ended in divorce after less than a year.

Stevens lived in Margate, Florida, from the late 1950s until 2004. She did public relations for Jack Marquesee, the city's developer. Many Margate residents referred to Stevens as the "First Lady of Margate" because every time she appeared on game shows, she placed a sign next to her nameplate that read "Hello Margate." She promoted Margate as "a great place to live and raise a family." Stevens served as grand marshal in many of the city's parades on July 4, and a city park is named in her honor. When Stevens was home in Margate for the Christmas holiday, she gathered her neighbors and friends and go to the Margate Hospital to sing Christmas carols to the patients.

In her last 20 years, Stevens did Christian ministry and only performed Christian or patriotic music.

She lived in retirement in Summerfield, Florida, and died at age 79 on December 28, 2011, after battling breast cancer and blood clots, according to Gerry Schweitzer, a close friend. She left no immediate survivors.

Vietnam
In 1965, Stevens went on a USO tour in Vietnam with Bob Hope and with a group of fellow entertainers to boost the morale of American soldiers. She was quoted as saying "I came back in 1965, and my life was in shambles because of what I saw".

In 1985, she made a call to N-E-W-H-O-P-E, a telephone counseling service. She found a new faith in Christianity and started her own ministry. The Brewer Christian College and Graduate Schools (Florida) awarded her a Doctor of Humane Letters for her humanitarian efforts as well as her role in supporting the U.S. soldiers in Vietnam.

Honors, awards, and nominations
Stevens received a Golden Globe nomination in 1964 for her work in the film The New Interns.

City of Margate officials named a park in her honor. Kaye Stevens Park is located 5825 Royal Palm Blvd. The city dedicated a life-size bronze statue of her on April 5, 2016.

Filmography
 The Interns (1962) as Nurse Didi Loomis
 The Man from the Diners' Club (1963) as Bea
 The New Interns (1964) as Didi
 The Great Masquerade (1974) as Officer Fulton
 Jaws 3-D (1983) as Mrs. Kellender

Television

Recordings

Albums
 "Ruckus at the Riviera" – Columbia Records
 "Kaye Stevens in Person at the Copa" – Liberty Records
 "Not So Great Songs from Not So Great Movies" – Liberty Records
 "Playgirls" – Liberty Records
 "The Grass Will Sing for You" – Liberty Records
 "The Temptation Shows Guest Starring Kaye Stevens" – Motown Records

Singles
 "You Brought Me Back to Love Again" – Sun Records
 "Someone Must Have Hurt You a Lot" – Capitol Records
 "Friends Are Friends Forever" – NLT Records
 "I'm Going Back to Tennessee" – NLT Records

References

Sources

External links
The Kaleo Institute at Brewer Christian College and Graduate School, Brewer Christian College and Graduate School website 

 A New York Times review mentioning Kaye Stevens (March 7, 2007)

1932 births
2011 deaths
Actresses from Pittsburgh
American performers of Christian music
American film actresses
American women singers
American musical theatre actresses
American television actresses
American women television personalities
Deaths from cancer in Florida
Deaths from breast cancer
People from Marion County, Florida
21st-century American women
Television personalities from Florida
United Service Organizations entertainers